Gorgama is a village located in the Samastipur District of Bihar, India.

The village is bordered by the Baya River on both the northern and western sides. It has approximately 1,800 residents, consisting mainly of Bhumihars. Both Scheduled Caste (SC) and Muslim residents live towards the western side of the village.

Rajkiya Kanya Madhya Vidyalaya and Rajkiya Sankul Pradhmik Vidyala are primary schools located in the village. They are adjacent to one other and are located on the northern bank of the Baya River. A large open field known as Kochar also lies adjacent to the Baya River; this is Gair Majarua land owned by the Bihar Government and is commonly used by locals for activities such as festivals. The village is situated near the Shahpur Patori railway station.

Residents of the village are primarily dependent on agriculture. Fish farming is the main occupation for those in the western regions of the Baya River, as evidenced by the presence of artificial ponds in the region. Other key agricultural drivers include the harvest of crops such as maize, tobacco, wheat, pulses, and other vegetables. Breeding animals, like goats and cows, is also a common occupation and a key source of income, and the animal excrement can be used as a natural fertilizer for crops.

In October 2019, a mosque opened in the village. The mosque, also known in Arabic as a 'masjid' (meaning "a place of ritual prostration"), was named Madina Masjid and became a place of prayer and worship for villagers of the Muslim faith.

References 

Villages in Samastipur district